The Zung Self-Rating Depression Scale was designed by Duke University psychiatrist William W.K. Zung MD (1929–1992) to assess the level of depression for patients diagnosed with depressive disorder.

 20–44 Normal Range
 45–59 Mildly Depressed
 60–69 Moderately Depressed
 70 and above Severely Depressed

The Zung Self-Rating Depression Scale has been translated into many languages, including Arabic, Azerbaijani, Dutch, German, Portuguese, and Spanish.

See also
Diagnostic classification and rating scales used in psychiatry
Zung Self-Rating Anxiety Scale

References

External links
 Zung Depression Scale - Online version

Depression screening and assessment tools